Raimo de Vries (born 10 June 1969) is a Dutch former professional footballer who played as a midfielder.

Career
Born in Den Helder, de Vries played college soccer with Wake Forest, scoring 28 goals and making 15 assists between 1989 and 1992. De Vries began his professional career in 1993 with the Raleigh Flyers. He later spent one season in Major League Soccer with Colorado, making four appearances.

Personal life
De Vries' son Jack is also a professional footballer.

References

1969 births
Living people
De Vries, Raimo
Dutch footballers
De Vries, Raimo
De Vries, Raimo
People from Den Helder
Dutch expatriate footballers
De Vries, Raimo
De Vries, Raimo
Association football midfielders